Nitrate reductase (NADPH) (assimilatory nitrate reductase, assimilatory reduced nicotinamide adenine dinucleotide phosphate-nitrate reductase, NADPH-nitrate reductase, assimilatory NADPH-nitrate reductase, triphosphopyridine nucleotide-nitrate reductase, NADPH:nitrate reductase, nitrate reductase (NADPH2), NADPH2:nitrate oxidoreductase) is an enzyme with systematic name nitrite:NADP+ oxidoreductase. This enzyme catalises the following chemical reaction

 nitrite + NADP+ + H2O  nitrate + NADPH + H+

Nitrate reductase is an iron-sulfur molybdenum flavoprotein.

References

External links 
 

EC 1.7.1